"Secrets" is the second single released from OneRepublic's second studio album, Waking Up. It was released as the first single in Germany and Austria owing to its presence on the soundtrack of Til Schweiger's film Zweiohrküken. The movie is the sequel to the film Keinohrhasen, for which "Apologize" was the film soundtrack. The song rocketed up the German and Austrian airplay charts. The song was released in the United States iTunes Store on November 3, 2010. The song was due for a UK release on April 5, 2011 but was later canceled. It was sent to U.S. Top 40/Mainstream radio on June 1, 2010. "Secrets" is written in the key of D major.

Critical reception
John Hill from About.com rated it with 4.5 stars (out of 5), praising Tedder for bringing nuance to the lyrics. Hill writes "The song starts out more like a conversation, but turns into a powerful plea by the time the chorus comes around." Hill speculates as to the meaning of this plea but thinks it best that listeners find their own meaning.

Music videos
The music video debuted on German television on October 16, 2009. It shows the band playing their instruments and Ryan Tedder singing. Furthermore, it features scenes from the film Zweiohrküken.

A second version of the video, was released as a promo for the premiere of the sixth season of the US TV series Lost. This version has takes from the original video, with the band playing on a studio, mixed with scenes from the series.

A third version, the music video that is used worldwide, has scenes from the original video with clips of a woman played by Nora Tschirner waiting for someone at a restaurant. The restaurant is the outdoor seating area of Wynkoop Brewing, located in an area of Denver known as LoDo.  All of exterior shots are also in Denver on the surrounding streets, Blake Street, 17th Street, Wazee Street, Wynkoop Street and alley.  Other notable landmarks in the video are Union Station and Coors Field. It premiered May 17, 2010 on Vevo.

A fourth version of the video features scenes from the Disney feature film The Sorcerer's Apprentice.

Commercial performance
"Secrets" debuted at No. 98 on the Billboard Hot 100 and later re-entered at No. 83, reaching its peak at No. 21. It is chronologically their fourth top 40 hit on the Billboard Hot 100.  The song has sold 3,070,000 digital copies in the US as of January 2014.

In popular culture
"Secrets" was featured in the television shows 30 Rock, Gossip Girl, Lost, Nikita and CSI: Miami and appeared in the Disney film The Sorcerer's Apprentice. The song also used to launch the "Big Pony" fragrance line for Ralph Lauren. An instrumental version of "Secrets" also featured prominently in the FaceTime portion of Apple's iPhone 4 video introduction in 2010. In the same year, it was used in many promotional trailers for ABC Family's TV series Pretty Little Liars. In 2011, the song was featured as runway soundtrack at the Victoria's Secret Fashion Show.

Track listing

Charts and certifications

Weekly charts

Year-end charts

Certifications

Release history

References

External links
 One Republic Official Website
 Dreaming Out Loud UK Website

2009 singles
Disney songs
Number-one singles in Poland
OneRepublic songs
Songs written by Ryan Tedder
Pop ballads
Interscope Records singles
Mosley Music Group singles
2009 songs
2000s ballads
2010 singles